Joachim von Hohenzollern (21 June 1554, in Sigmaringen – 7 July 1587, in Cölln) was a titular Count of Hohenzollern.

Life 
Joachim was the 4th surviving son of Count Karl I of Hohenzollern (1516–1576) from his marriage to Anna (1512–1579), the daughter of Ernst, Margrave of Baden-Durlach.

As the younger son, he was destined for a career in the clergy, typically as a canon.  In order to avoid this, Joachim converted to the Lutheran faith.  He was the only member of the Swabian branch of the House of Hohenzollern to do so.  He broke away from the Catholic relatives and moved to the Protestant court of the Elector of Brandenburg in Berlin.

Joachim died on 7 July 1587 and was buried in Berlin Cathedral.

Marriage and issue 
On 6 July 1578 in Lohra, he married Anna (d. 1620), the daughter of Count Volkmar Wolf of Hohnstein.  They had one son:
 Johann Georg (1580–1622), Count of Hohenzollern, Lord of Königsberg-Kynau, married:
 in 1606 to Baroness Elonore of Promnitz (1576–1611)
 in 1613 to baroness Katharina Berka of Duba and Leipa (d. 1633)

References 
 Gustav Schilling: Geschichte des Hauses Hohenzollern, in genealogisch fortlaufenden Biographien aller seiner Regenten von den ältesten bis auf die neuesten Zeiten, nach Urkunden und andern authentischen Quellen, F. Fleischer, 1843, p. 72

External links 
 http://www.hohenzollern-home.com/hbisn.htm

Counts of Hohenzollern
1554 births
1587 deaths
16th-century German people
Daughters of monarchs